IQVIA, formerly Quintiles and IMS Health, Inc., is an American multinational company serving the combined industries of health information technology and clinical research. IQVIA is a provider of biopharmaceutical development and commercial outsourcing services, focused primarily on Phase I-IV clinical trials and associated laboratory and analytical services, including consulting services. It has a network of more than 88,000 employees in more than 100 countries and a market capitalization of $49 Billion as of August 2021. As of 2017, IQVIA was reported to be one of the world's largest contract research organizations.

History
IQVIA is the result of the 2016 merger of Quintiles, a leading global contract research organization, and IMS Health, a leading healthcare data and analytics provider  The name of the modern company honors the legacy organizations. IQVIA: I (IMS Health), Q (Quintiles), and VIA (by way of).

IMS Health
IMS Health was best known for its collection of healthcare information spanning sales, de-identified prescription data, medical claims, electronic medical records and social media. IMS Health's products and services were used by companies to develop commercialization plans and portfolio strategies, to select patient and physician populations for specific therapies, and to measure the effectiveness of pharmaceutical marketing and sales resources. The firm used its data to produce syndicated reports such as market forecasts and market intelligence.

The original name of the company was Intercontinental Marketing Statistics, hence the IMS name. IMS Health's corporate headquarters were located in Danbury, Connecticut, United States. Ari Bousbib was the chairman and CEO of IMS Health before the merger.

 In 1998, the parent company, Cognizant Corporation, split into two companies: IMS Health and Nielsen Media Research. After this restructuring, Cognizant Technology Solutions became a public subsidiary of IMS Health
 In 2002, IMS Health acquired Cambridge Pharma Consultancy, a privately held international firm that provides strategic advice to pharmaceutical management.
 In 2002, IMS Health acquired the Rosenblatt Klauber Group, a privately held international consultancy that provides forecasting, opportunity assessment & management development services to pharmaceutical companies.
 In 2003, acquired Marketing Initiatives, a specialist in healthcare facility profile data, and Data Niche Associates, a provider of rebate validation services for Medicaid and managed care. In 2003, IMS Health sold its entire 56% stake in Cognizant and both companies are separated into two independent entities as IMS Health and Cognizant 
 In 2004, United Research China Shanghai was acquired, providing coverage of China's consumer health market.
 In 2005, acquired PharMetrics, a U.S. provider of patient-centric integrated claims data.
 In 2006, acquired the Life Sciences practice of Strategic Decisions Group, a portfolio strategy consultant to the life sciences industry.
 In 2007, IMS Health acquired IHS and MedInitiatives, providers of healthcare data management analytics and technology services. That same year, ValueMedics Research was acquired, extending IMS Health's health economics and outcomes research capabilities.
 In 2007, ranked in the Businessweek 50. This list represents "best in class" companies from the ten economic sectors that make up the S&P 500.
 In 2008, named to the World's Most Admired Companies list by Fortune. The company received the recognition again in 2010.
 In 2008, acquired RMBC, a provider of national pharmaceutical market intelligence and analytics in Russia.
 In 2008, acquired the Skura professional services group, based out of Mississauga, Ontario, Canada and specialized in data integration, consulting, and services in business intelligence platforms to pharmaceutical and healthcare clients in North America and Europe.
 In 2009, named to the Dow Jones Sustainability North America Index in recognition of the company's economic, environmental and social performance among the largest 600 North American companies.
 In February 2010, IMS Health was taken private by TPG Capital, CPP Investment Board, and Leonard Green & Partners.
 In 2010, acquired Brogan, Inc., a privately held market research and consulting firm serving the Canadian healthcare market.
 In 2011, expanded its specialty and patient-level data assets in the United States with the acquisition of SDI Health. Also that year, the company acquired Ardentia Ltd in the UK, and Med-Vantage in the United States to build on its payer services in those markets.
 In 2012, acquired PharmARC Analytic Solutions Pvt. Ltd, a Bangalore-based analytics company.
 In 2012, acquired DecisionView, a software solutions company that helps life sciences organizations plan and track patient enrollment for clinical trials and TTC, a benchmarking solutions and analytics company that helps clients plan for and negotiate the costs of clinical trials. Also in 2012, the company purchased PharmaDeals Ltd., 
 In 2013, acquired several companies to expand its portfolio of SaaS products: Incential Software, a provider of sales performance management technology services; 360 Vantage, which delivers multi-channel CRM software capabilities; Appature, which offers a relationship marketing platform; and Semantelli, a provider of social media analytics for the global healthcare industry.
 In May 2015, IMS increased its software development capability by acquiring Dataline Software Ltd, a bespoke software development company and big data research specialist in the UK.
 In April 2015, IMS Health completed the purchase of Cegedim's Customer Relationship Management (CRM) software and Strategic Data business for €396 million. Cegedim acquired the software and related business when it purchased Dendrite International in 2007.
 In August 2015, IMS Health completed the purchase of Boston Biomedical Consultants, a provider of market data and market research covering the in vitro Diagnostics market

Quintiles

Quintiles was the world's largest provider of biopharmaceutical development and commercial outsourcing services. The company offered clinical data management, clinical trial execution services, pharmaceuticals, drug development, financial partnering, and commercialization expertise to companies in the biotechnology, pharmaceutical and healthcare sectors.

In 1982, Dennis Gillings founded and incorporated Quintiles Transnational in North Carolina. Quintiles Transnational established Quintiles Pacific Inc. and Quintiles Ireland Ltd. in 1990. In 1991 Quintiles GmbH was established in Germany and Quintiles Laboratories Ltd. was established in Atlanta, Georgia. In September 1996, Quintiles purchased Innovex Ltd. of Britain for $747.5 million in stock. Quintiles went public in 1997 and completed a successful secondary stock offering.

 In 1974, Dennis Gillings signs the first contract to provide statistical and data management consulting for pharmaceutical clients.
 In 1982, Quintiles, Inc., is incorporated in North Carolina.
 In 1990, Quintiles Pacific Inc. and Quintiles Ireland Ltd. are established.
 In 1991, Quintiles GmbH is established in Germany; Quintiles Laboratories Ltd. is established in Atlanta, Georgia.
 In 1996, Quintiles buys Innovex Ltd. and BRI International Inc., becoming the world's largest CRO.
 In 1997, Quintiles goes public, completing a successful secondary stock offering.
 In 1998, Quintiles becomes the first company in the industry to break the $1 billion mark, when it reports net revenues of $1.19 billion.
 In 1999, the company joins the S&P 500 Index.
 In 2003, the Board of Directors agrees to merge with Pharma Services Holdings Inc; Quintiles becomes a private company.
 In 2009, Quintiles opens new corporate headquarters in Durham, North Carolina.
 In 2010, Quintiles opens new European headquarters in the UK and establishes operations in East Africa.
 In 2011, Quintiles buys Advion Biosciences, a bioanalytical lab based out of Ithaca, New York.
 In 2013, Quintiles filed for an IPO on 15 February in order to go public again; Quintiles begins trading on the New York Stock Exchange (NYSE) under ticker symbol Q.”

IMS Health and Quintiles become IQVIA
In May 2016, Quintiles agreed to merge with IMS Health in a deal worth $9 billion.   IMS Health shareholders received 0.384 shares of Quintiles common stock for each share of IMS Health common stock they held, leaving the split of ownership at 51.4% IMS and 48.6% Quintiles. The merger was completed in October and the resulting company was a $17.6 billion company called QuintilesIMS. In November 2017, the company adopted the new name of IQVIA, and changed its ticker symbol on the NYSE from Q to IQV.

Controversies 
Throughout its history, the legacy IMS Health's business of collecting anonymized pharmaceutical sales data came under scrutiny from both the media and the legal system.

IMS Health v. Ayotte was a free speech case involving IMS Health.

Sorrell v. IMS Health Inc. was a case about physician-data privacy, which went to the U.S. Supreme Court. The High Court ruled in favor of the company.

IQVIA was contracted by the UK government's Office of National Statistics to provide data on the prevalence of COVID-19 infection in the population. Some users of the survey reported problems contacting IQVIA and arranging for testing. The problems with how the survey results were collected were criticised for potentially leading to biased data by New Scientist.

References

External links
 

Companies listed on the New York Stock Exchange
Companies based in Durham, North Carolina
Contract research organizations
Consulting firms established in 1982
Life sciences industry
1982 establishments in North Carolina
2013 initial public offerings
1997 initial public offerings
International management consulting firms